The Engels single-member constituency (No. 166) is a Russian legislative constituency in the Saratov Oblast. The constituency covers southern and southeastern parts of Saratov Oblast and is anchored in the city of Engels.

Members elected

Election results

1993

|-
! colspan=2 style="background-color:#E9E9E9;text-align:left;vertical-align:top;" |Candidate
! style="background-color:#E9E9E9;text-align:left;vertical-align:top;" |Party
! style="background-color:#E9E9E9;text-align:right;" |Votes
! style="background-color:#E9E9E9;text-align:right;" |%
|-
|style="background-color: " |
|align=left|Nikolay Lysenko
|align=left|Independent
|58,579
|20.69%
|-
|style="background-color: " |
|align=left|Oleg Mironov
|align=left|Communist Party
| -
|14.70%
|-
| colspan="5" style="background-color:#E9E9E9;"|
|- style="font-weight:bold"
| colspan="3" style="text-align:left;" | Total
| 283,162
| 100%
|-
| colspan="5" style="background-color:#E9E9E9;"|
|- style="font-weight:bold"
| colspan="4" |Source:
|
|}

1995

|-
! colspan=2 style="background-color:#E9E9E9;text-align:left;vertical-align:top;" |Candidate
! style="background-color:#E9E9E9;text-align:left;vertical-align:top;" |Party
! style="background-color:#E9E9E9;text-align:right;" |Votes
! style="background-color:#E9E9E9;text-align:right;" |%
|-
|style="background-color: " |
|align=left|Oleg Mironov
|align=left|Communist Party
|115,863
|34.24%
|-
|style="background-color:#FF4400"|
|align=left|Vyacheslav Maltsev
|align=left|Party of Workers' Self-Government
|55,890
|16.52%
|-
|style="background-color:#3A46CE"|
|align=left|Vladimir Yuzhakov
|align=left|Democratic Choice of Russia – United Democrats
|32,460
|9.59%
|-
|style="background-color:"|
|align=left|Viktor Koryakov
|align=left|Liberal Democratic Party
|25,878
|7.65%
|-
|style="background-color:#23238E"|
|align=left|Oleg Karpov
|align=left|Our Home – Russia
|20,908
|6.18%
|-
|style="background-color: " |
|align=left|Nikolay Semenets
|align=left|Independent
|17,754
|5.25%
|-
|style="background-color:#DD137B"|
|align=left|Yuri Rustikov
|align=left|Social Democrats
|7,374
|2.18%
|-
|style="background-color: " |
|align=left|Aleksandr Polyakh
|align=left|Independent
|6,637
|1.96%
|-
|style="background-color: " |
|align=left|Anatoly Zhikharev
|align=left|Independent
|4,947
|1.46%
|-
|style="background-color: #F5821F" |
|align=left|Ivan Borisov
|align=left|Bloc of Independents
|3,188
|0.94%
|-
|style="background-color: " |
|align=left|Valentin Panichev
|align=left|Independent
|4,947
|1.46%
|-
|style="background-color: #FFF22E" |
|align=left|Vladimir Sanatin
|align=left|Beer Lovers Party
|2,692
|0.80%
|-
|style="background-color: " |
|align=left|Sergey Potrusov
|align=left|Independent
|2,114
|0.62%
|-
|style="background-color: #295EC4" |
|align=left|Nikolay Myasnikov
|align=left|Party of Economic Freedom
|1,962
|0.58%
|-
|style="background-color:#000000"|
|colspan=2 |against all
|30,425
|8.99%
|-
| colspan="5" style="background-color:#E9E9E9;"|
|- style="font-weight:bold"
| colspan="3" style="text-align:left;" | Total
| 338,345
| 100%
|-
| colspan="5" style="background-color:#E9E9E9;"|
|- style="font-weight:bold"
| colspan="4" |Source:
|
|}

1998

|-
! colspan=2 style="background-color:#E9E9E9;text-align:left;vertical-align:top;" |Candidate
! style="background-color:#E9E9E9;text-align:left;vertical-align:top;" |Party
! style="background-color:#E9E9E9;text-align:right;" |Votes
! style="background-color:#E9E9E9;text-align:right;" |%
|-
|style="background-color:"|
|align=left|Vasily Desyatnikov
|align=left|Independent
|76,766
|41.46%
|-
| colspan="5" style="background-color:#E9E9E9;"|
|- style="font-weight:bold"
| colspan="3" style="text-align:left;" | Total
| 243,610
| 100%
|-
| colspan="5" style="background-color:#E9E9E9;"|
|- style="font-weight:bold"
| colspan="4" |Source:
|
|}

1999

|-
! colspan=2 style="background-color:#E9E9E9;text-align:left;vertical-align:top;" |Candidate
! style="background-color:#E9E9E9;text-align:left;vertical-align:top;" |Party
! style="background-color:#E9E9E9;text-align:right;" |Votes
! style="background-color:#E9E9E9;text-align:right;" |%
|-
|style="background-color:"|
|align=left|Sergey Afanasyev
|align=left|Communist Party
|85,959
|25.28%
|-
|style="background-color: " |
|align=left|Vladimir Gusev
|align=left|Independent
|67,532
|19.86%
|-
|style="background-color:"|
|align=left|Viktor Tyukhtin
|align=left|Yabloko
|43,773
|12.87%
|-
|style="background-color:#3B9EDF"|
|align=left|Marina Alyoshina
|align=left|Fatherland – All Russia
|40,368
|11.87%
|-
|style="background-color:#1042A5"|
|align=left|Vladimir Yuzhakov
|align=left|Union of Right Forces
|27,500
|8.09%
|-
|style="background-color:"|
|align=left|Konstantin Grizoglazov
|align=left|Liberal Democratic Party
|8,902
|2.62%
|-
|style="background-color:#D50000"|
|align=left|Nikolay Soldatov
|align=left|Communists and Workers of Russia - for the Soviet Union
|8,872
|2.61%
|-
|style="background-color: " |
|align=left|Aleksandr Shinkarenko
|align=left|Independent
|7,921
|2.33%
|-
|style="background-color: #004BBC" |
|align=left|Vyacheslav Belovolov
|align=left|Russian Cause
|1,164
|0.34%
|-
|style="background-color:#000000"|
|colspan=2 |against all
|41,921
|12.33%
|-
| colspan="5" style="background-color:#E9E9E9;"|
|- style="font-weight:bold"
| colspan="3" style="text-align:left;" | Total
| 340,035
| 100%
|-
| colspan="5" style="background-color:#E9E9E9;"|
|- style="font-weight:bold"
| colspan="4" |Source:
|
|}

2003

|-
! colspan=2 style="background-color:#E9E9E9;text-align:left;vertical-align:top;" |Candidate
! style="background-color:#E9E9E9;text-align:left;vertical-align:top;" |Party
! style="background-color:#E9E9E9;text-align:right;" |Votes
! style="background-color:#E9E9E9;text-align:right;" |%
|-
|style="background-color: "|
|align=left|Nikolay Sukhoy
|align=left|United Russia
|140,965
|47.02%
|-
|style="background-color:"|
|align=left|Sergey Afanasyev (incumbent)
|align=left|Communist Party
|60,311
|20.12%
|-
|style="background-color:#1042A5"|
|align=left|Vladimir Yuzhakov
|align=left|Union of Right Forces
|17,279
|5.76%
|-
|style="background-color:"|
|align=left|Konstantin Grizoglazov
|align=left|Liberal Democratic Party
|12,779
|4.26%
|-
|style="background-color:"|
|align=left|Dmitry Oleynik
|align=left|Rodina
|9,599
|3.20%
|-
|style="background-color:"|
|align=left|Aleksandr Zhurbin
|align=left|Yabloko
|9,283
|3.10%
|-
|style="background-color:#164C8C"|
|align=left|Tamara Mangusheva
|align=left|United Russian Party Rus'
|5,006
|1.67%
|-
|style="background-color:#000000"|
|colspan=2 |against all
|39,184
|13.07%
|-
| colspan="5" style="background-color:#E9E9E9;"|
|- style="font-weight:bold"
| colspan="3" style="text-align:left;" | Total
| 300,024
| 100%
|-
| colspan="5" style="background-color:#E9E9E9;"|
|- style="font-weight:bold"
| colspan="4" |Source:
|
|}

2016

|-
! colspan=2 style="background-color:#E9E9E9;text-align:left;vertical-align:top;" |Candidate
! style="background-color:#E9E9E9;text-align:left;vertical-align:top;" |Party
! style="background-color:#E9E9E9;text-align:right;" |Votes
! style="background-color:#E9E9E9;text-align:right;" |%
|-
|style="background-color: " |
|align=left|Vasily Maksimov
|align=left|United Russia
|180,194
|53.90%
|-
|style="background-color:"|
|align=left|Sergey Afanasyev
|align=left|Communist Party
|63,412
|18.97%
|-
|style="background-color:"|
|align=left|Dmitry Pyanykh
|align=left|Liberal Democratic Party
|27,322
|8.17%
|-
|style="background-color:"|
|align=left|Toktar Sarsengaliev
|align=left|A Just Russia
|19,846
|5.94%
|-
|style="background:#D71A21;"|
|align=left|Aleksandr Grishantsov
|align=left|Communists of Russia
|11,886
|3.55%
|-
|style="background-color:"|
|align=left|Aleksey Mazepov
|align=left|Party of Growth
|8,416
|2.52%
|-
|style="background-color:"|
|align=left|Aleksandr Zhurbin
|align=left|Yabloko
|6,745
|2.02%
|-
|style="background-color:"|
|align=left|Konstantin Frolov
|align=left|The Greens
|6,012
|1.80%
|-
|style="background-color:"|
|align=left|Elnur Bayramov
|align=left|People's Freedom Party
|3,887
|1.16%
|-
| colspan="5" style="background-color:#E9E9E9;"|
|- style="font-weight:bold"
| colspan="3" style="text-align:left;" | Total
| 334,399
| 100%
|-
| colspan="5" style="background-color:#E9E9E9;"|
|- style="font-weight:bold"
| colspan="4" |Source:
|
|}

2021

|-
! colspan=2 style="background-color:#E9E9E9;text-align:left;vertical-align:top;" |Candidate
! style="background-color:#E9E9E9;text-align:left;vertical-align:top;" |Party
! style="background-color:#E9E9E9;text-align:right;" |Votes
! style="background-color:#E9E9E9;text-align:right;" |%
|-
|style="background-color: " |
|align=left|Aleksandr Strelyukhin
|align=left|United Russia
|136,409
|51.73%
|-
|style="background-color: " |
|align=left|Olga Alimova
|align=left|Communist Party
|60,721
|23.03%
|-
|style="background-color: " |
|align=left|Stanislav Denisenko
|align=left|Liberal Democratic Party
|14,545
|5.52%
|-
|style="background-color: " |
|align=left|Artyom Chebotaryov
|align=left|A Just Russia — For Truth
|14,445
|5.48%
|-
|style="background-color: " |
|align=left|Yevgeny Yevstafyev
|align=left|Communists of Russia
|8,567
|3.25%
|-
|style="background-color: " |
|align=left|Sergey Bugaenko
|align=left|Party of Pensioners
|7,959
|3.02%
|-
|style="background-color: "|
|align=left|Anastasia Uchakina
|align=left|New People
|6,916
|2.62%
|-
|style="background-color: " |
|align=left|Dmitry Lipensky
|align=left|Yabloko
|4,242
|1.61%
|-
|style="background-color: "|
|align=left|Vladimir Torgashev
|align=left|Rodina
|3,041
|1,15%
|-
| colspan="5" style="background-color:#E9E9E9;"|
|- style="font-weight:bold"
| colspan="3" style="text-align:left;" | Total
| 263,712
| 100%
|-
| colspan="5" style="background-color:#E9E9E9;"|
|- style="font-weight:bold"
| colspan="4" |Source:
|
|}

Notes

Sources
166. Энгельсский одномандатный избирательный округ

References

Russian legislative constituencies
Politics of Saratov Oblast